Ireland competed at the 2015 European Games, in Baku, Azerbaijan from 12 to 28 June 2015.

Boxer Brendan Irvine guaranteed Ireland its first ever European Games medal on 22 June by winning his quarterfinal in the men's 49 kg boxing event, thus ensuring at worst a bronze medal.

Medal summary

Archery

Ireland qualified two archers for the 2015 Games; as a result, Ireland was also eligible to field a team in the mixed pairs competition.

Badminton

Ireland qualified an entrant in each of the five events, including the top seeds in men's singles and mixed doubles, and the sixth seed in women's singles.

Basketball (3x3)

Ireland have qualified a women's team of four for the 3x3 Basketball competition because of results at the 2014 European 3x3 Championships.

Boxing

Ireland has qualified boxers for the following events.

Men

Women

Canoeing

Cycling

Diving

Ireland sent one diver to the games.

Gymnastics

Artistic
Men's team – Kieran Behan, Rohan Sebastian, Daniel Fox
 Women's team – Ellis O'Reilly, Tara Donnelly, Nicole Mawhinney

Judo

Karate

Shooting
Men's trap –

Ireland secured one quota in the shotgun events based on the European rankings on 31 December 2014.

Men

Swimming

Women's 200 m freestyle – 1 quota place (Rachel Bethel)
Women's 200 m breaststroke – 1 quota place (Mona McSharry)
Women's 100 m backstroke – 1 quota place (Danielle Hill)
Men's 100 m backstroke – 1 quota place (Rory McEvoy)
Women's 400 m Individual Medley, 400 m Free and 1500 m Free (Katie Baguley)

Taekwondo

Based on the WTF rankings as at 31 March 2015,Ireland secured one quota for the Games.

Triathlon

Ireland had three quota places in the Triathlon events. Aileen Reid gained the best result, 6th, in the women's race.

Wrestling
Men's freestyle

References

Nations at the 2015 European Games
European Games
2015